Sericomyia carolinensis (also called the Two-spotted Pond Fly), is a rare species in the family Syrphidae, found in the Southeastern part of the United States. It is distinguished by its all yellow face, single pair of small narrow yellow spots, and yellow pilose scutellum. Adults noted feeding on pear blossoms. The larval stage is unknown but is likely a "rat tailed" type larvae inhabiting nutrient rich waters, typical for the genus Sericomyia.

Description
For terms, see Morphology of Diptera.

Size: 

Head: The frons is yellow-orange immediately above the antennae. There is a black spot above that, which is more grayish towards the eyes. The vertex is dark brown. The face is completely yellow without a medial black stripe. The antennae are plumose. The eyes are bare and holoptic in males, but dichoptic in the females. The occiput has a silvery-white pollen-like covering.

Thorax: The scutum and scutellum are dark brown with yellow pile.

Wings: The wings are brown at the bases and at the of front edge of the  wing. The vein R4+5 slightly bent into cell r4+5.

Legs: All basitarsi are orange to reddish-brown. The hind femur is brown with a pale apical tip. Tibia paler brown and distinctly curved.

Abdomen: Shiny black  with one pair of yellow stripes on second segment. Yellow pile on the margin of abdomen, longer at the anterior.

External links

References

Hoverflies
Eristalinae
Insects described in 1917

Hoverflies of North America